Akademisk Boldklub Gladsaxe (or AB) is a Danish professional football club from Gladsaxe north of Copenhagen,
currently playing at the 3rd highest level of Danish domestic football in the Danish 2nd Division group 1.

The club was established on February 26, 1889, through a merger of Fredericia Studenternes Kricketklub and Polyteknisk Boldklub. AB is nine time Danish Champions, eight time Copenhagen Champions, one time Danish Cup Champions and six times Copenhagen Cup Champions, and the club is thus one of the most successful in Danish football.
 
The club has training and club facilities in Bagsværd north of Copenhagen and plays its home matches at Gladsaxe Stadium, also called Stade de Lundberg, named after one of the club's pioneers, Knud Lundberg.
 
Since the foundation, AB has played in a green and white kit and had an owl as mascot. The club's official fan club is named AB Forever and was founded in 1995.
 
AB is one of the oldest football clubs in Denmark and is originally from Copenhagen. Here the club had training facilities on Østerbro from 1903 to 1922. From 1923 to 1965 the club had training facilities on Nørrebro. In 1965, AB moved to Gladsaxe where the club belongs today. Most of the club's titles were won in the time in Copenhagen, especially in the 1890s and the 1940s.
 
The club participated in the foundation of the Danish Football Association in 1889 and has over the years developed many football players who have played on the Danish national team, including Harald Bohr, Karl Aage Hansen, Knud Lundberg, Kresten Bjerre and René Henriksen. Harald Bohr's brother, the Nobel Prize winning physicist Niels Bohr, did not make it to the national team, but indeed played for the club, as a goalkeeper.

History

The foundation 
Akademisk Boldklub was founded on February 26, 1889, through a merger of the two academic sports clubs Fredericia Studenternes Kricketklub and Polyteknisk Boldklub. Fredericia Studenternes Kricketklub was a cricket club founded in 1884 by graduating students from the Latin School in Fredericia. When they became students in 1883, they moved to Copenhagen to study at the University of Copenhagen. The following year, they founded the club so that they could play cricket again.
 
Like most other clubs at the time, Fredericia Studenternes Kricketklub originally only had cricket on the program. However, from around 1887, football became more popular in Denmark as Frederik Markmann, chairman of the board of Københavns Boldklub, took the initiative to translate the laws of the English Football Association to Danish in collaboration with three clubmates and Holger Forchhammer from Fredericia Studenternes Kricketklub. The club got football on the program from then on and participated in Københavns Boldklub's Medal Football Competition.
 
Holger Forchhammer and his brother Johannes Forchhammer were key people in Fredericia Studenternes Kricketklub at that time. Holger Forchhammer took initiative to start a collaboration with Herlufsholm Kostskole, where Holger's father was the rector, to recruit talented players to the team. Holger also became board member of AB's first board and chairman of the National Olympic Committee and Sports Confederation of Denmark from 1897 to 1899, while Johannes became chairman of the Danish Football Association from 1894 to 1897.
 
With the introduction of football on the program, the club opened for admission from other schools than Fredericia Studenternes Kricketklub. Eventually, the number of Copenhageners in the club grew larger and the name of the club became unrepresentative of its member. Therefore, members of Fredericia Studenternes Kricketklub and Polyteknisk Boldklub were convened on February 26, 1889, for a joint meeting between the two clubs in order to arrange a merger. Polyteknisk Boldklub was a somewhat younger club from 1885 which consisted of students and graduates from Technical University of Denmark. The result of the meeting was a merger between the two clubs and the foundation of Akademisk Boldklub.
 
In relation to the merger, new requirements for becoming a member of AB were introduced. The admission requirement was that one had an entrance examination from a Scandinavian university or from the Technical University of Denmark. However, an exemption could be granted for this requirement if the board decided unanimously to register a member or if 15 members of the club recommended a person.
 
At the establishment of AB, the club got a new logo with an owl as a mascot. The owl is a symbol of wisdom and learning and has been the club's mascot since the foundation. The newly established club played in a green and white kit, as did the Fredericia Studenternes Kricketklub.

The early years 
Shortly after the foundation, on April 1, 1889, AB moved to new premises on Østerbro in Copenhagen where the club during the year grew to have 104 active members and 15 passive members.
 
On March 5, 1889, AB played its first official football match. The match was played at Blegdamsfælleden in Copenhagen, and AB won 2–0 against the opponent BK Frem.
 
In 1889, AB participated in the establishment of the Danish Football Association together with 21 football clubs from Copenhagen and five from the province. On April 27, 1889, AB won the Danish Football Association's first tournament, defeating the until then invincible club Københavns Boldklub. In the period 1890–1900, AB had great success and won the Copenhagen Football Championship eight times.
 
In 1890 AB played the first Danish-Swedish football match in the history when Halmstads BK was defeated 3–0 away from home.
 
Football was not yet played at schools at the time, and AB therefore started a junior department with the intention of recruiting talented young players. However, the department had to close again in 1897 due to the bad behavior of its members. In 1899, the club tried again and this time it had more success as the department's member count rose to 70 during the first year. The first two members of the new junior department were brothers Niels Bohr and Harald Bohr, who both later came to play on AB's first-team squad. Harald Bohr already debuted at AB's first-team squad at the age of 16, where he became known as the first dribble in Danish football and was dubbed Lille Bohr by the press. He always played with a white handkerchief in the pocket, which he used to measure the wind direction and strength before and during matches. Harald, who later became a world renowned mathematician, played four international matches with the Danish national team during his career. Niels Bohr became more famous outside the football field as a Nobel Prize winner and in his work as a professor, which was illustrated in a match against German football team Mittweida Tecnicum. In the match, Niels Bohr played as a goalkeeper, and as the ball rarely came near AB's goal, he spent the time leaning against one of the goal posts. Suddenly, a long ball was kicked toward AB's goal, which the crowd expected Niels Bohr to collect. However, he did not respond before a spectator shouted at him and the ball had already gone into the goal. After the game, he admitted that his thoughts were on a mathematical problem that he had attempted to solve by making calculations on the inside of the post.

Getting a pitch on Østerbro
In 1902, AB set up a work committee aimed at making AB a pitch owning club like neighboring club Københavns Boldklub and B93 had just become. The committee collected DKK 60,000 for the financing of the facilities, which came primarily from interest free bond loans from supporters of the club. In autumn 1902, the club rented six acres of land at Lammefælleden on Østerbro in Copenhagen by Copenhagen Municipality for the establishment of the new training facilities, which was put into service already in 1903.
 
Shortly after the establishment of the new training facilities, AB also got a new home ground. Interest in sports was increasing in the early 19th century, and for this reason, the mayor of Copenhagen Jens Jensen in 1906 presented a proposal for the establishment of a sports park, which was granted DKK 1,264,450 for the construction of. In 1911, Københavns Idrætspark was completed and the facility became home to the Danish national team and several Copenhagen football clubs, including AB.
 
AB's football game developed drastically as the club went from the uneven grounds they had played on so far to good fields on the new facilities. The good results AB had achieved so far in the Copenhagen Football Championship, however, did not survive in the period after the move to Østerbro. A highlight in the period after moving to Østerbro was when the team played 2–2 against professional Middlesbrough F.C. from England. In 1912, the poor results reached a new low point when AB ended last in the domestic tournament and had to play a relegation match against Østerbros Boldklub. AB won the relegation match 3-1 and was thus rescued from relegation.
 
In the 1910s, the results began to improve again, and in 1914, AB participated in its first Copenhagen Cup final, but lost 3–4 to KB. In 1919, the luck eventually turned when AB won its first Danish Championship after defeating B 1901 3–0 in the final. KBU's tournament, which led to the final of the Danish domestic football tournament, was won in a convincing way with 11 wins and only one defeat and a goal score of 46–16. In 1921, AB again won the Danish Championship when AGF was defeated 3-0 by a team consisting of many of the same players who had won the championship two years earlier.
 
During the years on Østerbro, AB and BK Frem collaborated on arranging so-called "English matches", as KB and B93 had also done it where professional foreign clubs were invited to a football tournament in Copenhagen. The English matches generated large spectator revenues for the arranging clubs due to the great interest in seeing the professional English teams.

Moving to Nørrebro

In 1919, the Copenhagen Magistrate terminated the lease of the ground of AB's training facilities as of October 1, 1919. AB was therefore seized to suddenly be completely without a training facility after having had training facilities on Østerbro for 16 years. AB did however negotiate an amendment to the agreement, which meant that the club could use the facility until the ground was taken into service but had to accept a reduction of notice for the termination of the ground to one month. On January 1, 1922, the magistrate finally terminated the lease as construction was planned. AB was then again referred to play on uneven fields without any facilities.
 
With police chief J. Parker as new chairman of AB from 1922, AB managed to find new training facilities in 1923. The Danish state's gymnastics institute was opened at Nørre Allé on Nørrebro in Copenhagen on March 10, 1923. At the institute, training facilities were to be set up, which AB was allowed to manage for an area of 10 barrels of land. To fund the new facilities, AB set up a funding committee. The committee experienced great support from many well-known people in the academic world, which helped raise awareness about the need for funding. Copenhagen Municipality supported with a loan of DKK 40,000 and AB had itself saved DKK 40,000 through a lending fund. DKK 20,000 was missing, which was generously granted as a loan by neighbor club BK Frem. Work on the new facilities began in June 1923, and on September 13, 1924, the facilities, designed by architect Carl Brummer, were officially opened.
 
On the sports front, AB's football team did mediocre in the years following the move to Nørrebro, as the team for many years ended in the middle and bottom of the row. In the mid-1930s, the luck began to return to the football team. In 1936, AB was runner-up in the Danish Championship and won its first Copenhagen Cup when KB was defeated 3–1 in the final. The cup championship gave the players a will to get even better, and the team practiced hard over the winter to improve. The practice helped as the club won its third Danish Championship in 1937.
 
At the end of the 1920s, the number of members in the youth department increased steadily, and AB began to level divide the teams. With a strong coach team led by Carl "Skomager" Hansen, the youth department achieved great success in this period and won the juniors tournament in 1928, 1929, 1930, 1932, 1933, 1937 and 1938.

Golden era 

 
In 1939, AB celebrated the club's 50th anniversary on restaurant Nimb in Copenhagen. At the same time, the club began a period of great success. In 1939, the advent of the World War II could be felt in Europe. On the sports front, the war meant that much international sports cooperation was interrupted, but also that interest in sports increased as the offer of leisure activities was limited. Membership in AB increased to over 1,000 during the war period. The attendance to AB's matches was about 30,000 during this period, and in 1944, a total of 43,000 spectators saw AB play the final in the Danish Championships against BK Frem.
 
During the 1940s, a new generation of talented players such as Knud Bastrup-Birk, Georg Dahlfeldt and Karl Aage Hansen were raised, which helped ensure AB great success in the following years. The team already had a strong base of established players, consisting of among others Eyolf Kleven and Knud Lundberg who were in the national team in three sports (football, handball and basketball). With the former AB player Arne Kleven as coach, AB won several Copenhagen Cup finals and Danish Championships in the 1940s. The club won the Danish Championship in 1943, 1945 and 1947, silver medals in 1942, 1944 and 1949, and bronze medals in 1946 and 1948. AB won the Danish Cup final in 1942, 1944, 1945 and 1949, and were furthermore in the final in 1946. At the Olympic Games in London in 1948 where the Danish national football team won bronze, AB had six players on the team: Karl Aage Hansen, Knud Bastrup-Birk, Knud Lundberg, Poul Petersen, Ivan Jensen and Holger Seebach. In December 1948, AB's first-team squad went on a training trip to Barcelona in Spain and Algiers in Algeria where the team played two matches against FC Barcelona each of which was attended by around 40.000 spectators. The first match ended 1-1, while the second match was lost 1–2.
 
AB's success continued into the 1950s where a new generation of players ensured that AB between 1950 and 1958 each year was ranked top 4. The club became Danish Champions in 1951 and 1952, and the Copenhagen Cup was won in 1950, while the club participated in the Cup final in 1953 and 1956. In 1960, Knud Lundberg ended his career as 40-year-old after 340 matches for AB's first-team squad. AB was relegated to the second tier for the first time ever in 1960 but got promoted back to the first tier the following year.

Moving out to Gladsaxe
In 1958 the Danish Ministry of Education terminated the lease of the ground of AB's training facilities. This happened despite the fact that the ministry had previously stated that AB did not have to fear a resignation. In spite of protests from AB's board of directors and the fact that AB through the club's contribution to student sport throughout the previous 70 years had exempted the university from carrying out this task, the Ministry chose to terminate the lease for the entire area as of April 1, 1962 The ministry could not relocate AB to another area in Copenhagen.
 
The club was allowed to use the facilities for a period of time despite the termination of the lease, but the prospect of being left without training facilities pushed the club to negotiate a move of the club with communes in Copenhagen's suburbs. Gladsaxe Municipality met the club with both goodwill and realism and thus became AB's new base. The move to Gladsaxe was helped by the mayor of the city Erhard Jacobsen who wanted to make Gladsaxe a pioneer municipality, which involved getting an elite sports club to the municipality. At the same time, there was a great deal of support for the move from the municipal council, the sports committee, the engineers of the municipality and Bagsværd Idrætsforening, which offered to join an association with AB.
 
After pulling and opposition among both the members of AB and Bagsværd Idrætsforening, the two clubs held a founding general assembly on January 17, 1962, where the association became a reality. For AB, the association and relocation involved a union change from DBU Copenhagen to DBU Zealand. At the same time, the association meant that university affiliation was no longer required to become a member of the club. The association with Bagsværd Idrætsforening also meant that AB got handball on the program so that the club offered four sports – football, cricket, tennis and handball.
 
When the negotiations about moving AB to Gladsaxe finally went through, the construction of new training facilities began in Bagsværd. The facilities included eight football pitches and an indoor hall, which was the largest in Northern Europe at the time. In 1965 the new facilities were ready, and AB's relocation from Nørrebro to Gladsaxe was a reality. From then on, AB had training facilities at Skovdiget in Bagsværd and the first-team squad's home matches were played on Gladsaxe Stadium.
 
The relocation to Gladsaxe quickly came to create challenges for AB. On the social level, a new community had to be built. Economically, AB became indebted due to the high costs of establishing the new training facilities as well as falling revenues due to low attendance rates at home matches and a slowdown in member-uptake.
 
On the sports front, the relocation to Gladsaxe offered both ups and downs. AB's youth team won the Danish Championship in 1963 for the first time in the club's history. A large part of the team later went on to play on the club's first-team squad, which won AB's latest Danish Championship in 1967 under the leadership of Mario Astorri. The team played technical and forward-playing football, which they had learnt in their youth years in AB. In 1970, AB was one goal of winning the club's 10th Danish Championship.
 
In the late 1960s and early 1970s, AB participated in European football in the UEFA Champions League and UEFA Europa League. In 1968, AB achieved its best results in European football in the history of the club when the team qualified for the 2nd round of Champions League after having defeated the Swiss football club FC Zürich 4-3 overall in the tournament's 1st round. The opponent in the 2nd round was Greek AEK Athens. AB lost 0-2 overall after having played 0–0 away in the first match. The home match was interrupted by protesters who ran on the field to demonstrate against the Military Junta in Greece.
 
In the following years, AB experienced a prolonged downturn. From 1974 to 1985, AB was stuck in the second tier, and in 1985 AB was relegated even further to the third tier of Danish football for the first time ever in the history of the club. The decision to introduce professional football in Denmark in 1978 became tough for AB, as the club struggled to adapt to the new reality.

Success in the 1990s
In the early 1990s, AB again experienced success as a team of talented players who had been in AB for many years, helped promote AB to the best Danish league. These players remained in AB even though they had offers from many other clubs. Among these players were René Henriksen who later became the Danish national team's captain, Peter Rasmussen who has the match club record with 394 matches and today is the club's CEO and Peter Frandsen who played 392 matches for AB and later became coach for the first-team squad. This team of strong AB players helped promote AB to the second tier in 1993 under the leadership of former Danish champion with AB Johnny Petersen. The team ended as number three in 2nd division East, thus qualifying for two playoff matches against Nørresundby Boldklub. The matches ended 3–3 in the away and 2–2 at home, and AB was thus promoted to a better row for the first time since 1972.
 
After a couple of seasons in 1st Division, Tonni Nielsen was appointed as new coach in AB in 1996, and he helped lead the team to the cup final. AB had previously knocked out Brøndby IF in the quarterfinals, but the club lost to F.C. Copenhagen in the final. AB also got promoted to the best Danish row Superligaen in 1996 – just two years after having promoted to the second tier. AB was thus back in the best Danish series for the first time since 1973. In 1997, Christian Andersen became the new head coach. Christian Andersen represented forward-playing and technically based football, which AB became known for in the late 1990s. The success of the team culminated in 1999 when AB ended on a third place in the league and became Danish Cup Champions after having won 2–1 against AaB.
 
In 2000, AB won bronze medals again, and in 2001, AB participated in the cup final but lost to Silkeborg IF. At the end of the 1990s, AB had a team consisting of many young talented players, many of whom won the Danish Football Association's talent prize. Peter Løvenkrands won in 1998, Martin Albrechtsen won in 2000 and Stephan Andersen won in 2003.
 
After a few years of mediocre results, AB was relegated to the second tier in 2004.

Economic crisis
AB's latest upturn was started by talented players who helped AB advance through the rows, but the sustained success was also sparked by the transformation of AB from an amateur union into a professional football business. This process was initiated by the three new board members Bent Jakobsen, Denis Jørgen Flemming Holmark and Torben Mærsk who in short time raised large capital sums through a stock exchange introduction of the club.
 
In the 1997/98 season, the board introduced full-time professionalism in AB, and great efforts were made to achieve success in the league with the appointment of Christian Andersen as head coach and with the purchase of several profiles. The board wanted to make AB a power factor in Danish football again through a business plan based on buying and selling players, sporting success, TV revenues, entrance fees, merchandise sales and talent development.
 
On November 24, 1997, AB was transformed from a private limited company to a limited company, and the share capital was also expanded to DKK 36,700,000. The money was invested in significant upgrades of the team, staff and facilities. At the same time, a drastic expansion of Gladsaxe Stadium, which was intended to create a foundation for a modern football business, was initiated.
 
In 1998, the new board members pushed the CEO for six years, Henrik Mostrup, out of the management and instead appointed the former AB profile Per Frimann as new CEO. Shortly after – in November 1998 – AB was introduced on Copenhagen Stock Exchange where the club brought DKK 93,000,000 to course 115.
In the following years, huge amounts of money were invested in new players. At the same time, many profiles were sold to balance the accounts.
However, AB had bought too many players too expensive, which meant that no money was earned. Despite the large equity from the IPO in 1998 and several large million sales to international top clubs, there were nevertheless blood-red numbers in the annual accounts, especially in the early years of the 2000s. In the 2000/2001 annual account, the deficit was DKK 36,392,000. The same year, measures to reduce operating expenses were therefore initiated. At the same time, rumors came up about possible bankruptcy and a merger with FCK, but this was however rejected. In 2001, Per Frimann resigned as CEO of AB and moved to a role as sports director. In 2002, the deficit was still high at DKK 21,472,000. Per Frimann chose to resign as sports director on April 19, 2002.
 
Despite further efforts to balance the economy, AB continued to have a major deficit of DKK 15,941,000 in 2003. During this period, the chairman of the board Mogens Trygve Lied Flagstad and vice-chairman of the board Allan Kim Pedersen initiated an investigation of the possibilities of a merger with Farum Boldklub to improve the club's future economic basis. However, both left the board after the amateur club's main board had informed the professional club's board and the public that it was critical of the investigation.
 
In the following years, a slimming of the company was initiated, which was necessary after the overuse of capital in the previous years. The slimming meant, however, that the club had to sell the last profiles such as Nicolai Stokholm, Rasmus Daugaard, Mohamed Zidan and Stephan Andersen. As a consequence, the results got worse and in 2004, AB was relegated to the second tier.

AB in recent times 
While again playing in the Danish 1st Division, AB launched Vision 2010 with the goal of returning to the best Danish league by 2010. At that time AB had a talented team of many players from the club's academy, which in 2008 had won the Danish Championship for youth players. The vision was close to be realized with a third place in 2009 and a fourth place in 2010, but it failed and left AB again in financial problems. In subsequent years, AB experienced poorer results, and for three consecutive years – from 2012 to 2014 – the existence in the second tier was saved in the final round of the tournament. In 2012, AB was rescued from relegation by defeating Hobro IK 3–1. In 2013 the club saved its existence by defeating Lyngby FC 4–2. In 2014, the rescue was secured by playing 3–3 with HB Køge. In 2015, AB finally relegated and moved down to the third tier for the first time since 1994.

The 2015-16 season was a successful one for the club as it bounced back from relegation to win promotion back to the Danish 1st Division at the first time of asking under the dutiful charge of manager Per Frandsen. Despite this, however, the beginning of the season proved challenging with the club suffering a heavy defeat in the first round of the Danish Cup at the hands of rivals Lyngby Boldklub and only finishing third in its group behind Hvidovre IF and Hellerup IK to progress to the Spring promotion group.

Concerns remained after a 1–0 defeat to Aarhus Fremad in the opening game of the Spring promotion round, although they quickly dissipated over the following months as AB strolled to the Danish 2nd Division title with promotion finally confirmed after a 2–1 win over Aarhus Fremad.

The season came to a close following a remarkable 6–4 home victory over second placed Fremad Amager. Whilst the game saw AB lift the Danish 2nd Division trophy after the final whistle, it also proved a poignant moment for the club with a number of well regarded players, including cult hero Simon Bræmer, saying their farewells.

The next season, AB could not sustain the success and ended last in 1st Division, thus relegating back to 2nd Division.
 
In June 2012, AB was rescued from bankruptcy by a majority in Gladsaxe Municipality Council. As a result of the cooperation with Gladsaxe Municipality, the club changed its name in September 2012 to Akademisk Boldklub Gladsaxe to mark the club's association with the local area.
 
AB currently has about 1,500 members and a profiled youth division which has raised talents such as Nicolai Jørgensen, Oliver Lund, Klaus Lykke and Lukas Lerager.
 
AB operates Copenhagen Sport & Event Park centered around the facilities on Gladsaxe Stadium.

In November 2022, AB was sold to the British-American investor group Five Castles Football Group LLC.

Stadium

AB plays their home matches at Gladsaxe Stadium. The stadium is located on Gladsaxevej 200, Søborg, Gladsaxe Municipality, in Copenhagen, and is primarily used for football matches. The stadium has a capacity of 13,507, of which 7,707 are covered seats. The rail size is 105 x 68 meters, and the lighting is 700 lux.

The construction of the stadium was started in 1938, and the stadium was inaugurated on May 26, 1940, under the name Gladsaxe Idrætspark Marielyst. The stadium was expanded and renovated beginning on November 16, 1998. This renewal of the stadium included constructing a new long side with both upper and lower grandstand, a sponsor lounge and two end stands with only standing room without a roof. At the same time, the running course around the pitch was removed. The stadium was subsequently inaugurated under its new name, Gladsaxe Stadium, on September 12, 1999. The opposite stand of the newly constructed stand is from the 1960s. Gladsaxe Stadium is also called Stade de Lundberg, named after one of the club's pioneers, Knud Lundberg.

The stadium spectator record was set on April 18, 2004, with 10,039 spectators in the Superliga match between AB and FC Copenhagen.

Honours
 
 Danish Champions:
 Winners (9): 1919, 1921, 1937, 1943, 1945, 1947, 1951, 1952, 1967
 Silver (10): 1917, 1932, 1936, 1942, 1944, 1949, 1950, 1955, 1957, 1970
 Bronze (8): 1929, 1939, 1946, 1948, 1954, 1956, 1999, 2000
 Danish Cup:
 Winners (1): 1999
 Runners-up (3): 1956, 1995, 2001
 Danish Super Cup:
 Winners (1): 1999
 Copenhagen Champions:
 Winners (8): 1890, 1892, 1893, 1894, 1895, 1896, 1899, 1900
 Silver (5): 1891, 1897, 1898, 1901, 1908
 Bronze (3): 1904, 1905, 1907
 Copenhagen Cup:
 Winners (6): 1936, 1942, 1944, 1945, 1949, 1950
 Runners-up (6): 1914, 1915, 1925, 1931, 1946, 1953
51 seasons in the Highest Danish League
29 seasons in the Second Highest Danish League
11 seasons in the Third Highest Danish League

Results
The table below is an overview of AB's seasons in the Danish domestic football tournament since it was established in 1927.

Table last updated: 13 June 2022.

International appearances

Table last updated: 14 August 2018.

Players

As of 31 January 2023

Coaching staff
 Head coach: Patrick Birch Braune
 Assistant coach: Stefan Payberg Larsen
 Assistant coach: Morten Timm Kannegaard
 Goalkeeper coach: Martin Lundqvist
 Physical coach: Emil Rohde Larsen
 Mental coach: Michael Skovgaard
 Physiotherapist: Rasmus Ishøj Ibsen

Table last updated: 1 December 2022.

National team players
The table below is an overview of current and previous AB players who have represented their national team.

Table last updated: 10 August 2018

Previous coaches

Table last updated: 10 June 2019

Supporters

Fan club

AB's official fan club is called AB Forever and was founded on August 17, 1995. During home matches, the fan club stands on Gladsaxe Stadium's section E. The work on founding fan club started already in the spring of 1993 when a group of youth coaches increasingly felt frustrated over the fact that AB's youth players did not come to the stadium when AB's first team played matches. AB played in the 3rd tier under the leadership of Johnny Petersen and had great players such as René Henriksen and Peter Rasmussen on the team. The football was entertaining but there was no atmosphere on the stadium when the team played. The group of youth coaches therefore began organizing themselves with the aim of getting more supporters to the stadium. The group who later established the fan club got its name from the first team's most dangerous player, the striker Finn Buchardt who has scored 62 goals for AB. In a match against Herlev IF on June 6, 1993, Finn Buchardt scored four goals in the last 15 minutes of the match, meaning that a potential 2–2 draw was turned to a 6–3 victory. The last 15 minutes of a football match were from then on called "Boogie time" with reference to Finn Buchardt, and the group of fans around the youth coaches subsequently called themselves for "Boogie's friends".

As more supporters joined, the need for a more formal organization became apparent, and the group held a founding general assembly on August 17, 1995. The general meeting named AB's first fan club AB Forever and appointed Thomas Gram as the fan club's first president. The vision for the fan club was to take distance from violence and to give support to the team in an unconventional way, which were reflected in a variety of humorous songs and a friendly approach to supporting the team.

In the following years, the fan club took the initiative to produce and sell merchandise in the form of caps, scarves and T-shirts. However, AB bought the inventory and took over the merchandise sales in 1997.

Rivalries

AB's supporters are known for their rivalries with the neighboring clubs of Lyngby Boldklub and Brønshøj Boldklub.

AB's matches against Brønshøj Boldklub are known as Bog Derbies. A victory in the match gives the winning team the "right" to the nearby bog Utterslev Mose. The Bog Derby has been played 62 times, with 32 wins to AB, 19 draws and 11 wins to Brønshøj, and a goal score of 127–70 in AB's favor.

Spectators
The table below shows the development of spectators at AB's home matches since the season 1996/1997.

 Table last updated: 4 August 2022.

Management

Chairmen
The table below is an overview of chairmen of AB's board throughout time.

Table last updated: 1 December 2022.

CEOs
The table below is an overview of CEOs of AB throughout time.

Table last updated: 1 December 2022.

Notes

References

External links

 Akademisk Boldklub Gladsaxe's official website

 
Football clubs in Denmark
Association football clubs established in 1889
1889 establishments in Denmark
Gladsaxe Municipality
Football clubs in Copenhagen